Wilds Hall, also known as the Peter A. Wilds House and Wilson House, is a historic home located at Springville, Darlington County, South Carolina.  It was built about  1839, and enlarged to its present size about 1850. It is a -story, rectangular, weatherboard clad, frame residence with gabled roof.  It sits on a low stuccoed brick pier foundation. Also on the property are four associated outbuildings. Peter Wilds was a wealthy planter owning 111 slaves in 1860. This house was lived in by four generations of the Wilds family over a 130-year period.

It was listed on the National Register of Historic Places in 1985.

References

Houses on the National Register of Historic Places in South Carolina
Houses completed in 1839
Houses in Darlington County, South Carolina
National Register of Historic Places in Darlington County, South Carolina